National Women's Football League may refer to:
 National Women's Football Association - a former full-contact American football league formed in 2000.
 National Women's Football League - a former women's American football league formed in 1974.